|}

The Gillies Fillies' Stakes is a Listed flat horse race in Great Britain open to fillies and mares aged three years or older. 
It is run at Doncaster, over a distance of 1 mile, 2 furlongs and 43 yards (2,051 metres), and it is scheduled to take place each year in November.

The race was first run in 2003.

Winners

See also
 Horse racing in Great Britain
 List of British flat horse races

References 
Racing Post: 

Flat races in Great Britain
Doncaster Racecourse
Middle distance horse races for fillies and mares
2003 establishments in England
Recurring sporting events established in 2003